Vyacheslav Leonidovich Gerashchenko (born 25 July 1972) is a Belarusian professional football coach and a former player who is the manager of Dnepr Mogilev.

Club career
Gerashchenko played for Chernomorets Novorossiysk, CSKA Moscow and Uralan Elista in the Russian Premier League. He retired after rupturing his Achilles tendon at age 34.

International career
Gerashchenko made 19 appearances for the Belarus national football team.

Honours
Slavia Mozyr
Belarusian Premier League champion: 2000

References

External links
 
 

Living people
1972 births
People from Mogilev
Sportspeople from Mogilev Region
Belarusian footballers
Association football defenders
Belarusian expatriate footballers
Belarus international footballers
Expatriate footballers in Russia
Russian Premier League players
FC Dnepr Mogilev players
FC Chernomorets Novorossiysk players
PFC CSKA Moscow players
FC Elista players
FC Belshina Bobruisk players
FC Torpedo Mogilev players
FC Slavia Mozyr players
FC Naftan Novopolotsk players
FC Savit Mogilev players
Belarusian football managers
Belarusian expatriate football managers
Expatriate football managers in Lithuania
FC Dnepr Mogilev managers
FC Belshina Bobruisk managers
FC Lida managers
FC Gomel managers
FK Palanga managers
FC Smorgon managers
FC Naftan Novopolotsk managers